Saint-Amant-de-Bonnieure (literally Saint-Amant of Bonnieure) is a former commune in the Charente department in southwestern France. On 1 January 2018, it was merged into the new commune of Val-de-Bonnieure.

Population

See also
Communes of the Charente department

References

Former communes of Charente
Charente communes articles needing translation from French Wikipedia